Justin Myers (born January 15, 1985 in Phoenix, Arizona) is an American retired soccer player.

Career

College and amateur 
Myers grew up in San Diego, CA, attended Torrey Pines High School, and played three years as goalie at University of California, Berkeley.

Professional 
Myers was signed by Chivas USA of Major League Soccer in 2007 as a backup goalkeeper, but never made a first team appearance for the side and was waived at the end of the season.

In 2008 Myers was signed by the Puerto Rico Islanders of the USL First Division, and was subsequently sent on loan to Sevilla FC Puerto Rico following the Islanders regular reserve keeper, Michael Behonick, recovery from a leg injury. In September 2008 he returned to the Islanders squad after the Behonick suffered a hand injury, and he would go on and play his first match for the squad on September 21, 2008, the last match of the 2008 regular season.

Myers has since also spent time on loan with another Puerto Rico Soccer League side, Bayamon FC.

Honors

Club
Puerto Rico Islanders
 USL First Division Championship runners-up: 2008
 Commissioner's Cup: 2008
 CFU Club Championship runner-up: 2009

References

External links
 Puerto Rico Islanders bio

1985 births
Living people
California Golden Bears men's soccer players
Chivas USA players
Puerto Rico Islanders players
San Diego Gauchos players
Bayamón FC players
USL First Division players
Expatriate footballers in Puerto Rico
American soccer players
Sevilla FC Puerto Rico players
Expatriate footballers in Vietnam
USL League Two players
Association football goalkeepers
American expatriate sportspeople in Vietnam
American expatriate soccer players
Soccer players from San Diego